Wilfred Hamilton-Shimmen is a British executive director based in Singapore.

Biography 
Shimmen was born in Singapore and as an infant, was interned with his mother at the Japanese Internment Camp at the Sime Road Camp in Singapore during World War II. His father, a British naval base administrator in Singapore, was executed by Japanese.

Around 1980, Shimmen gave up his Singaporean citizenship for British citizenship.

Shimmen wrote a poem, The Reef, which was published by Illustrated Weekly of India on 7 June 1959) and Merdeka Bridge (which was published in The Seed in 1961 - a publication of the Malaysian Sociological Research Institute).

In 1994, Shimmen published a novel, Seasons of Darkness, which is about the experiences of a Eurasian living in Singapore which are mostly based on his own experiences.

Shimmen owns a public relations company, of which he is executive director, in Singapore.

References

Singaporean writers
Living people
Year of birth missing (living people)